Zhang Meng may refer to:

Zhang Meng (warlord) (fl. 206–210), an administrator in the military history of the Three Kingdoms
Zhang Meng (director) (born 1975, 张猛), Chinese director
Alina Zhang or Zhang Meng (born 1981, 张萌), Chinese actress
Lemon Zhang or Zhang Meng (born 1988, 张檬), Chinese actress
Zhang Meng (footballer, born 1983), Chinese footballer
Zhang Meng (footballer, born 2000), Chinese footballer
Zhang Meng (murder victim) (1966–2008), Chinese woman murdered in Singapore